Kumar Bapi

Electric Zoo Festival, a music festival in New York
Raychem EZF, a coaxial cable “F” connector
EZF stands for Zero Franc Economic  Entrepreneur Model created by Dr. Samuel Mathey and Professor Bruno Bernard introduced in Africa by FAFEDE